Lovelyville is the third album by Thinking Fellers Union Local 282, released December 12, 1991, on LP and CD through Matador Records. The CD contains a set of bonus tracks titled "The Crowded Diaper".

Recording

In between the studio recordings on Lovelyville are a great number of lo-fi snippets of what the band calls "Feller filler"—"murkier meanderings recorded in rehearsals on a four-track or boom box." A few bits of Feller filler are lo-fi version of the band's single "2×4s", and the song "Mother Uncle Delicious Tasty" is a sped-up voice speaking over a slowed-down recording of the song "Change Your Mind" from the band's previous album. Also present on the album are snippets of dialogue between Peter J. Haskett and Raymond Huffman from the Shut Up, Little Man! tapes that had been circulating in San Francisco.

Lovelyville also features a cover of "Green-Eyed Lady" by Sugarloaf.

Track listing

Lovelyville

The Crowded Diaper

Personnel 
Thinking Fellers Union Local 282
Paul Bergmann – drums
Mark Davies – bass guitar, guitar, Casio synthesizer, drums, euphonium, vocals, trombone on "Nothing Solid"
Anne Eickelberg – bass guitar, vocals
Brian Hageman – guitar, viola, tape, vocals, mandolin
Jay Paget – drums
Hugh Swarts – guitar, vocals
Production and additional personnel
Paul Bergmann – accordion on "Nothing Solid"
Chris Clougherty – clarinet on "Nothing Solid"
Greg Freeman – production, engineering
Margaret Murray – illustrations, oboe on "Nothing Solid"
Chas Nielsen – illustrations
Thinking Fellers Union Local 282 – production
David Tholfsen – contrabass clarinet on "Nothing Solid"

References

External links 
 

1991 albums
Matador Records albums
Thinking Fellers Union Local 282 albums